Chrysis scutellaris is a species of cuckoo wasps (insects in the family Chrysididae).

Subspecies
 Chrysis scutellaris marteni Linsenmaier, 1951 
 Chrysis scutellaris scutellaris Fabricius, 1794

Description
Head and chest are greenish blue while scutellum and abdomen are mainly golden red. At the rear edge of the third tergite it has 4 teeth.

Biology
Chrysis scutellaris fly from late June to early August. The larvae parasitize solitary wasps (Eumenes pomiformis) and bees (Halictus maculatus).

Distribution and habitat
These quite common wasps can be found in most of Europe and in North Africa (Algeria, Egypt). This species prefers warm, open and sandy areas.

References 

Insects described in 1794
Chrysidinae
Insects of North Africa